Porta Bari, previously called Porta de Bari, was one of the main gates of the city of Altamura, before the city walls of the city were torn down over the 19th century. Similarly to most European cities (such as Vienna), the city walls were torn down, because the new technology and military techniques employed starting from the 19th century made them useless for defense purposes.

History 
The gate, as it appears today, was built between the 16th and 17th centuries. The previous gate was quite different from today. Before it was rebuilt, on top of the gate there used to be a small church, the  chiesetta di SS. Annunziata. The first evidence of the existence of this small church dates back to the 1490, and it was super portam de Bari (Latin, i.e. "on top of Porta Bari"); documents about visits to the church by archdeacons testify that the church had some issues, since it could be reached only through an uncomfortable ladder and it was located above one of the main gates of the city.

On top of the gate is a stone inscription, attributed to Saint Alphonsus Liguori

The inscription is a reference to the Eucharist. On top of the whole building, a monstrance is clearly visible. Originally, the monstrance was made of stone (more precisely, of Mazzaro stone, like the whole building). In 1939, for the first Diocesan eucharistic congress, the stone monstrance was removed and replaced with a steel monstrance.

Outside of this gate, on 22 March 1799 (during the Altamuran Revolution of 1799), Altamura's "civic guard" welcomed the new governo dipertimentale "parading with the beating of drums and the French and national flags". The gate is also known because, on the night between 9 and 10 May 1799 (during the same Altamuran Revolution), most Altamurans managed to flee from Fabrizio Ruffo and the Sanfedisti army through this gate, which wasn't then surveilled by guards.

The gate, together with the above building, wasn't destroyed in the 19th century presumably because of its beauty or because it was inseparable from the nearby palace Palazzo De Angelis-Viti. The gate and the palace haven't been restored to their original whiteness yet (as done with Altamura Cathedral), although it is the first historical building that tourists see when they enter the city.

Gallery

References

Bibliography

See also 
 Porta Matera
 Megalithic Walls of Altamura
 Altamura
 Epitaph of Altamura
 Altamura Man
 Altamura Bread

Altamura
Gates of Altamura